The Violin Concerto No. 2 in C-sharp minor, Opus 129, was Dmitri Shostakovich's last concerto. He wrote it in the spring of 1967 as an early 60th birthday present for its dedicatee, David Oistrakh. It was premiered unofficially in Bolshevo, near Moscow, on 13 September 1967, and officially on 26 September by Oistrakh and the Moscow Philharmonic under Kirill Kondrashin in Moscow.

Scoring and structure

The concerto is scored for solo violin, piccolo, flute, two oboes, two clarinets, two bassoons, contrabassoon, four horns, timpani, tom-tom drum and strings.

It lasts around 30 minutes and has three movements:

Analysis

The key of C-sharp minor is a difficult one for the violin.

The first movement is in sonata form and concludes with a contrapuntal cadenza. The Adagio is in three parts, with a central accompanied cadenza. The final movement is a complex rondo. It has a slow introduction, three episodes between the refrains, and a further long cadenza before the third episode reprising material from earlier in the work.

Concertos by Dmitri Shostakovich
Shostakovich 2
1967 compositions
Compositions in C-sharp minor